Isaac Botella Pérez de Landazabal (born 12 June 1984, in Elche, Alicante) is a Spanish male artistic gymnast and part of the national team.  He participated at the 2008 Summer Olympics and 2012 Summer Olympics.

References

External links 
 
 
 

1984 births
Living people
Spanish male artistic gymnasts
Gymnasts at the 2012 Summer Olympics
Olympic gymnasts of Spain
Place of birth missing (living people)
Gymnasts at the 2008 Summer Olympics